Pencarreg is a village and community located in Carmarthenshire, Wales,  to the south-west of Lampeter.

Settlement is primarily grouped around the A485 road from Lampeter to Carmarthen, the primary settlement being Cwmann. The population in the United Kingdom Census 2001 was 1,120, increasing to 1,169 at the 2011 Census.

The community is bordered by the communities of: Llanycrwys; Cynwyl Gaeo; Llansawel; and Llanybydder, all being in Carmarthenshire; and by: Llanwenog; Llanwnnen; Lampeter; and Llanfair Clydogau, all being in Ceredigion.

References

External links 
www.geograph.co.uk : photos of Pencarreg and surrounding area	
Church at Pencader

Communities in Carmarthenshire
Villages in Carmarthenshire